Varvara Aleksandrovna Popova (17 December 1899 - 31 October 1988) was a Soviet stage and film actress. She appeared in early silent films by Yakov Protazanov and Mikhail Doller, but most of her credits date from the 1960s, when she was in demand for character roles, generally as a grandmother, peasant woman, etc. She appeared in several fairy-tale films by Aleksandr Rou. For many years she was a member of the company of the Vakhtangov Theatre.

Selected filmography
 1925 - His Call - Katya Sushkova
 1957 - The Snow Queen (1957 film) - Granny
 1963 - Fitil - Old woman on the pier
 1964 - The Chairman - Samokhina
 1964 - Jack Frost - Old blind woman
 1965 - Time, Forward! - Old woman in the hut
 1967 - Woman's World - Komarikha
 1969 - The Brothers Karamazov - Matryona
 1969 - Barbara the Fair with the Silken Hair - Stepanida
 1973 - The Golden Horns - Grandmother Anastasia

References

External links
 

1899 births
1988 deaths
Soviet film actresses
Russian film actresses
Russian silent film actresses
20th-century Russian actresses